This is a complete list of the individual parliaments of the Parliament of Malaysia.

1st Parliament of the Federation of Malaya: 1959–1963
1st Malaysian Parliament: 1963–1964
2nd Malaysian Parliament: 1964–1969
3rd Malaysian Parliament: 1971–1974
4th Malaysian Parliament: 1974–1978
5th Malaysian Parliament: 1978–1982
6th Malaysian Parliament: 1982–1986
7th Malaysian Parliament: 1986–1990
8th Malaysian Parliament: 1990–1995
9th Malaysian Parliament: 1995–1999
10th Malaysian Parliament: 1999–2004
11th Malaysian Parliament: 2004–2008
12th Malaysian Parliament: 2008–2013
13th Malaysian Parliament: 2013–2018
Members of the Dewan Rakyat, 14th Malaysian Parliament: 2018–present